The Zigong Dinosaur Museum is located near the city of Zigong, Sichuan, China, in the township of Dashanpu.

History 
The museum sits on top of a large concentration of a diverse dinosaur assemblage from the Shaximiao Formation. The museum claims the largest number of dinosaur fossils in the world and covers 25,000 square meters with a display area of 3,600 square meters. It attracts up to seven million visitors a year.

In 1980s, vast quantities of dinosaur fossils were excavated in the Middle Jurassic Shaximiao Formation, 7 km north-east from downtown Zigong, including a dinosaur named after the township, Dashanpusaurus. Because of the unique and articulated (intact) bone remains, Zigong is important to paleontologists and dinosaur enthusiasts. The Zigong Dinosaur Museum was established in 1987, becoming the first museum based almost entirely on dinosaurs in Asia. Mounted specimens include Omeisaurus, Gigantspinosaurus, Yangchuanosaurus, Huayangosaurus and Xiaosaurus.

See also
 List of museums in China

References

Dinosaur museums in China
Museums in Sichuan
Museums established in 1987
1987 establishments in China
Zigong
National first-grade museums of China